Lauren Rembi (born 9 March 1992) is a French right-handed épée fencer and two-time team European champion and 2016 Olympian.

Career
Rembi competed in the women's individual épée and the women's team épée events at the 2016 Summer Olympics. In the individual épée, she defeated the 2016 European individual épée champion Simona Gherman in the round of 32 and lost to the current world no. 1 Emese Szász in the semi-finals. She lost the bronze medal match to Sun Yiwen 13-15.

Personal life
Rembi's father is from the Democratic Republic of the Congo and her mother is from Martinique. Rembi began fencing at age six and her older sister Joséphine Jacques-André-Coquin represented France in fencing.

Medal Record

European Championship

World Cup

References

External links
 

1992 births
Living people
Fencers from Paris
French female épée fencers
Olympic fencers of France
Fencers at the 2016 Summer Olympics
Universiade medalists in fencing
French sportspeople of Democratic Republic of the Congo descent
French people of Martiniquais descent
Mediterranean Games bronze medalists for France
Mediterranean Games medalists in fencing
Competitors at the 2018 Mediterranean Games
Universiade gold medalists for France
Medalists at the 2011 Summer Universiade
Medalists at the 2013 Summer Universiade
20th-century French women
21st-century French women
Black French sportspeople